Luis Alberto Miloc Pelachi (January 31, 1929 in Montevideo, Uruguay – November 10, 1998 in Bogotá, Colombia) is a former Uruguayan footballer and manager and currently played for clubs of Uruguay, Chile, Colombia and Venezuela and managed in clubs of Colombia and Venezuela.

Teams (Player)
  Huracán Buceo 1940-1946
  Nacional 1947
  Universidad de Chile 1948
  River Plate (Montevideo) 1949
  Cúcuta Deportivo 1950-1954
  La Salle FC 1955
  Cúcuta Deportivo 1956-1960
  Independiente de Santa Fe 1961-1962

Teams (Coach)
  Atlético Junior 1968-1971
  Cúcuta Deportivo 1972-1976
  Deportivo Táchira 1977-1978
  Girardot FC 1979

References
 

1929 births
1998 deaths
Uruguayan footballers
Uruguayan expatriate footballers
Uruguayan football managers
Huracán Buceo players
Club Atlético River Plate (Montevideo) players
Club Nacional de Football players
Cúcuta Deportivo footballers
Independiente Santa Fe footballers
Universidad de Chile footballers
Uruguayan Primera División players
Chilean Primera División players
Categoría Primera A players
Expatriate footballers in Chile
Expatriate footballers in Colombia
Expatriate footballers in Venezuela
Association football forwards
Atlético Junior managers
Cúcuta Deportivo managers
Deportivo Táchira F.C. managers